Kiitoksia is a genus of aquatic protist. The taxonomic position of the genus is still uncertain and it has not found a robust location in any subgroup.

Two species are confidently known in the genus: Kiitoksia ystava and Kiitoksia kaloista. K. ystava was first discovered in Tvärminne in the Gulf of Finland. K. kaloista was discovered in Sombre Lake on Signy Island, near Antarctica. A third species, K. parva was transferred from the genus Clautriavia by Smith and Scoble 

The Kiitoksia species are single-celled organisms approximately 2-4 micrometres in size and round in shape. The species can be distinguished by their flagella: K. ystava has two flagella, one short and one long, while K. kaloista has one long flagellum.

Name 
"" is a Finnish word for "thanks". The phrase "" means "thank you, friend", while "" means "thanks for the fish". The latter name is a reference to the Douglas Adams novel: So Long, and Thanks for All the Fish.

References 

 Tikhonenkov, D. V, Benthic heterotrophic flagellates from the Red Sea littoral (Gulf of Suez, Egypt). Zoologičeskij žurnal, 2009, vol. 88: (11),  1291–1297, 

Eukaryote genera